The Myzolecaniinae are a subfamily of scale insects belonging to the family Coccidae. They are commonly known as soft scales, wax scales or tortoise scales. The females are flat with elongated oval bodies and a smooth integument which may be covered with wax. In some genera they possess legs but in others, they do not, and the antennae may be shortened or missing. The males may be winged or wingless.

Genera
There are 17 genera worldwide.

 Akermes
 Alecanium
 Alecanopsis
 Cribolecanium
 Cryptostigma
 Cyclolecanium
 Halococcus
 Houardia
 Megasaissetia
 Myzolecanium
 Neolecanium
 Paractenochiton
 Pseudophilippia
 Richardiella
 Torarchus
 Toumeyella
 Xenolecanium

References

External links

 
Hemiptera subfamilies